Gerlinde Stobrawa (born 23 January 1949 in Altkünkendorf), also known under her Stasi code name IM Marisa,  is a former politician for Die Linke and its predecessors. She was a member of the council of the Bezirk of Frankfurt (Oder) from 1984 to 1989, and completed a degree in sociology at the Parteihochschule Karl Marx of the Socialist Unity Party of Germany from 1986 to 1988. She was elected to the Landtag of the state of Brandenburg in 1990 and served as its vice president from 2005 to 2009.

The fact of Stobrawa having a past as an informer for the East German secret police Stasi was public knowledge since 1991. However she resigned in November 2009 as Vice President of the Landtag when the extent of her past was revealed by the Federal Commissioner for the Stasi Records. Stobrawa argued that as part of her activities on the council of the Bezirk of Frankfurt (Oder) she met and was responsible for international delegations from a variety of countries, and that related security matters had to be monitored by the Ministry for State Security (Stasi).

See also
Renate Adolph

References 

1949 births
Living people
The Left (Germany) politicians
People of the Stasi
East German women